Laudakia vulgaris, also known as Egyptian rock agama, is a species of agamid lizard. It is found in Egypt, Jordan, Israel, Syria, southern Lebanon, and northern Saudi Arabia.

Subspecies
The following 3 subspecies, including the nominotypical subspecies, are recognized as being valid.

Laudakia vulgaris vulgaris 
Laudakia vulgaris brachydactyla : northern Saudi Arabia, southern Israel, Sinai, Jordan
Laudakia vulgaris picea : southwest Syria, southern Lebanon, northern Israel, northwest Jordan

References

Laudakia
Lizards of Asia
Reptiles described in 1801